The Red line, or "to cross the red line", is a phrase used worldwide to mean a figurative point of no return or line in the sand, or "the fastest, farthest, or highest point or degree considered safe."

Origins
The origin of the phrase in English traces back to the "Red Line Agreement" in 1928 between largest oil companies of Britain, the USA and France at the time of the end of the Ottoman Empire. At the time of signature, the borders of the former empire were not clear and to remedy the problem an Armenian businessman named Calouste Gulbenkian, took a red pencil to draw in an arbitrary manner the borders of the divided empire.

The expression remained significant to global diplomacy and was reused during the UN's founding after the WWII, especially in the English-speaking world. Uniquely, in France one would "cross the yellow line" (franchir la ligne jaune).

History of usage

In Israel, the phrase was notably used as a political metaphor by Foreign Minister Yigal Allon, in 1975, when said that Washington "has managed to draw a red line which all the Arab countries know they must not cross - that America is not going to sacrifice Israel for the sake of Arab support." Yitzhak Rabin later used the phrase to refer to the line past which the Syrian Army should not be allowed to cross after the 1976 occupation of Lebanon.  On September 27, 2012 at the 67th United Nations General Assembly at the U.N. Headquarters in New York City in a speech addressing Iran's nuclear program Israeli Prime Minister Benjamin Netanyahu publicly added a red line to a prepared bomb cartoon.

According to Ben Yagoda, a professor of English and journalism at the University of Delaware, in 1987, there are references to "red lines" in conflicts between Chad and Libya, and in a 1999 New York Times article, Muslim clerics in Iran are reported to draw a "'red line for the revolution' that no one should cross." These references occurred earlier as well, appearing a Milwaukee Sentinel article of 26 January 1984 regarding French intervention in Chad and a "red line" held by French forces in southern Chad.

The phrase has been used by U.S. diplomats going back to the 1990s. For example, U.S. officials, quoted by Reuters news agency in May 1994, used the term in reference to negotiations with North Korea over the withdrawal of reactor fuel; and Martin Walker in The Guardian used the same phrase in June, in reference to statements by United States officials. Secretary of State Warren Christopher used the phrase in reference to NATO control over the peace-keeping mission in the Bosnian War on the CBS program Face the Nation on 22 October 1995.  Barack Obama used the phrase on August 20, 2012, during the Syrian civil war in relation to chemical weapons, saying that "We have been very clear to the Assad regime, but also to other players on the ground, that a red line for us is we start seeing a whole bunch of chemical weapons moving around or being utilized. That would change my calculus. That would change my equation." 

In the US, the phrase then became a source of contention when political opponent John McCain said the red line was "apparently written in disappearing ink," due to the perception the red line had been crossed with no action. On the one year anniversary of Obama's red line speech the Ghouta chemical attacks occurred. Obama then clarified "I didn't set a red line. The world set a red line when governments representing 98 percent of the world's population said the use of chemical weapons are abhorrent and passed a treaty forbidding their use even when countries are engaged in war," in reference to the Chemical Weapons Convention.

Thin Red Line

From British English, an entirely different figure of speech for an act of great courage against impossible order or thinly spread military unit holding firm against attack, or the "thin red line", originates from reports of a red-coated Scottish regiment at the Battle of Balaclava during the Crimean War. A journalist described a "thin red streak tipped with a line of steel" with the appearance of the 93rd (Highland) Regiment and parts of the Turkish army as they stood before (and repelled) a vastly superior force of Russian cavalry. The reference was soon shortened into the thin red line, and famously described by Rudyard Kipling in the poem Tommy as "the thin red line of 'eroes [heroes]."

Notable literary uses included George Orwell who in A Clergyman's Daughter invented a book-within-a-book called the "Hundred Page History of Britain, a 'nasty little duodecimo book' of 1888, which declared anachronistically that Napoleon 'soon found that in the “thin red line” he had more than met his match.'" American author James Jones later used The Thin Red Line as the title of his 1962 novel about the Battle of Guadalcanal, helping to further popularize its usage.

Its popularity of this use in the USA has increased since the Andrew Marton's 1964 movie and Terrence Malick's 1998 movie of Jones's novel, the latter of which was ranked as one of the 10 best action and war films of all time.

The basic idea has been extended in the 20th century to apply to police officers, as The Thin Blue Line, in reference to the frequently blue color of police uniforms.

See also
Redline - maximum engine speed before probable engine damage

References

Metaphors referring to places
Political catchphrases